Union Jack and the Megatones were a US band that gained popularity during the third wave of ska in the late 1990s in the Austin, Texas area.  They hailed from Cedar Park and Leander, Texas, and were known regionally as the "first ska band from Cedar Park".  The band's lyrical content addressed the anxieties of teenage relationships, the difficulties of being musicians, and general silliness.  The music was an eclectic mix of third-wave ska, alternative, pop and marching band sounds.

History

The band was formed initially in 1997 in the wake of the "summer of ska".  First performing at a Leander High School talent show as a joke, the group grew more serious and gained recognition in the Austin area, especially in their hometowns.  Though musicians came and went throughout the band's history, by the time of their most successful EP, 1999's Kamikaze, the membership had solidified to its final state.  The group disbanded in 2000, at the height of their popularity, when B.J. Golding left the band.

Membership

B.J. Golding - Guitar and vocals
Robert Harpold - Trumpet
Matt Kay - Tenor Saxophone
Dale Morris - Bass and vocals
Ethan Morris - Drums
Noel Burns - Trombone

Discography
1998 - Union Jack and the Megatones EP
1999 - Kamikaze EP

See also
Ska
Marching band
Leander high school

References
 Baker, Anna: "Best Bets", Austin American-Statesman, 7 June 1999
 Bigley, Lauren: "Local ska band holds appeal for everyone", Leander Roar, 23 September 1999

American ska musical groups
Cedar Park, Texas
1997 establishments in Texas
Musical groups established in 1997
Musical groups disestablished in 2000